Rinchnacher Ohe is a river of Bavaria, Germany. It is a right tributary of the Schwarzer Regen, the upper course of the Regen, near the town Regen.

See also
List of rivers of Bavaria

References 

Rivers of Bavaria
Rivers of Germany